The president of the Legislative Assembly of Costa Rica is the presiding officer of that legislature.

Sources
Official website

Lists
Presidents of the Legislative Assembly
Costa Rica, Presidents of the Legislative Assembly